Baleares was a  heavy cruiser of the Spanish Navy whose control was taken by the Nationalist side during the Spanish Civil War. The two ships of the class were built upon a British design and were a modified version of the Royal Navy′s . Baleares was constructed in Spain by the Vickers-Armstrongs subsidiary Sociedad Española de Construcción Naval, and saw service during the Spanish Civil War, when she was torpedoed and sunk by destroyers of the Spanish Republican Navy during the Battle of Cape Palos.

History
In December 1936, Baleares was commissioned in an incomplete state, not mounting the fourth turret. The turret was installed by June 1937.

Spanish Civil War
On February 1937, takes part together with Canarias and Almirante Cervera in the battle of Málaga. It fired bombs against those escaping  through the only exit of the city  —the road from Málaga to Almería—  in the sad episode that will be known as "La Desbandá" or Málaga–Almería road massacre. Despite all efforts made by Franco to hide what happened, the Canadian doctor Norman Bethune managed to take photographs and wrote about this experience in The New York Times: “We counted at least 5000 kids  under 10 years, thousands of them barefoot… We decided to go back and start transporting them to set them safe.”. It is calculated that, with the rest of the units, it caused more than 12800 civil victims.

On 12 July 1937, Baleares encountered six Republican destroyers escorting two merchant vessels near Valencia. After a brief exchange of fire, the Republican ships escaped.

While the destroyers and merchants broke off the engagement, Libertad and Méndez Núñez engaged Baleares. The cruiser was damaged by several hits from Libertad in critical areas and a fire in the  ammunition storeroom, but she limped away successfully. Two Republican freighters changed course to the south during the engagement and ran aground near Cape Cherchell. One of them was lost while the other was salvaged and interned by French authorities.

In March 1938, Baleares—along with fellow Nationalist cruisers  and —engaged the Republican cruisers Libertad and Méndez Núñez, accompanied by five destroyers, off Cartagena, in the Battle of Cape Palos. At around 02:15 am on 6 March, the Nationalist and Republican cruisers engaged in an ineffective gunnery duel. Two or three torpedoes from Lepanto hit Baleares between "A" and "B" turrets, detonating her forward magazine and sinking her. Out of her crew of 1,206, she had 765 seamen killed or missing, among them Vice-Admiral Manuel Vierna Belando, commander of the cruiser division.

The British destroyers  and  rescued part of the survivors, although a Republican air attack interrupted the rescue and caused one British fatality.

A monument to the crew killed in the sinking of Baleares has been erected in Palma de Mallorca. In the Basque town of Ondárroa, from which many of the crew members came, there are two monuments honoring Baleares, in the port and the cemetery.

References

Bibliography

External links
BUQUESDEGUERRA.COM, a Spanish website about warships (Spanish)

Canarias-class cruisers
Ships built in Spain
1936 ships
Military units and formations of the Spanish Civil War
Maritime incidents in 1938
Shipwrecks in the Mediterranean Sea
Shipwrecks of the Spanish Civil War
Mediterranean naval operations of the Spanish Civil War
Naval magazine explosions